Andrea Roane (born 1949) is a former American newscaster for WUSA Channel 9 television in Washington, DC.

Early life and education

Andrea Roane was born on October 5, 1949. in New Orleans, Louisiana.  She attended Holy Ghost Elementary School and graduated from the Xavier University Preparatory School. In 1971, she obtained a B.A. in Secondary Education from Louisiana State University in New Orleans (now the University of New Orleans), followed by an M.A. in Drama & Communications in 1973.

Career

In 1971, Roane worked as a middle and high school teacher of English.  In 1975, she became education reporter for public television station WYES, hosted a weekly magazine show, and became project director of a federally funded education show.  In 1976, she worked for CBS affiliate WWL-TV.  In 1978, she returned to WYES and then moved to Washington, D.C.

In 1979, Roane became host and chief correspondent for Metro Week in Review at public television station WETA.

In 1981, Roane moved to CBS-affiliate WUSA as Sunday evening and weekday morning anchor.  Over the years, she anchored morning, afternoon, and late night news programs.  She also served as health reporter.  Local news including The Washington Post'''' have covered her career throughout.

On April 25, 2018, Roane announced that she would retire from the news business as of July 31, 2018.

Personal life

Roane married Michael Skehan; they have two children.

In 1993, Roane started a DC-based breast cancer awareness program "Buddy Check 9."

Roane has played an active role in community services, including the John F. Kennedy Center for the Performing Arts Community and Friends Board, Capital Breast Care Center Community Advisory Council, and the National Museum of Women In The Arts, the Prevent Cancer Foundation, the Georgetown Lombardi Cancer Center Health Disparities Initiative, the National Catholic Education Association Board, and the Catholic University of America, and the Women's Forum of Washington.

Honors and awards

 Dame of the Sovereign Military Order of Malta
 Lifetime members of the NAACP and the National Council of Negro Women
 Emmy Awards
 Gracie Awards
 2006:  "Washingtonians of the Year" of Washingtonian Magazine''
 Community Service Award of Sibley Memorial Hospital Foundation
 2010:  Rebecca Lipkin Honoree for Media Distinction by Susan G. Komen For the Cure
 2012:  Faith Does Justice Award from Catholic Charities
 2014:  DC Hall of Fame
 2015:  Board of Governors Award by National Academy of Television Arts & Sciences, National Capital Chesapeake Bay Chapter

See also

 WUSA

References

External sources
 
 
  (January 27, 2014)

American women television journalists
1949 births
Living people
Journalists from Louisiana
Television anchors from New Orleans
Television anchors from Washington, D.C.
University of New Orleans alumni
20th-century American journalists
21st-century American journalists
African-American Catholics
20th-century African-American women
20th-century African-American people
21st-century American women
21st-century African-American women
21st-century African-American people